The 2010–11 Kent State Golden Flashes men's basketball team represented Kent State University in the college basketball season of 2010–11. The team was coached by Geno Ford and played their home games at the Memorial Athletic and Convocation Center as members of the Mid-American Conference (MAC) East Division.  On March 4, 2011, the team clinched their second-consecutive outright MAC regular season championship by defeating the Akron Zips 79–68 in Kent.  It was the first back-to-back regular season titles in the MAC since Miami accomplished the feat in 1991 and 1992 and first back-to-back outright titles since Ball State in 1989 and 1990.

Before the season

Roster changes

Recruiting

Roster

Coaching staff

Schedule 

|-
!colspan=9|  Exhibition

|-
!colspan=9| Regular Season

|-
!colspan=9| Mid-American Conference tournament

|-
!colspan=9| 2011 NIT

|- style="background:#f9f9f9;"
| colspan=10 | *Non-Conference Game.  #Rankings from AP Poll.  All times are in Eastern Time Zone.
|}

After the season

Comments 
Following their overtime loss to Akron in the MAC tournament championship game, the team was seeded 7th in the 2011 National Invitation Tournament, which they automatically qualified for by winning the MAC regular season championship.  They played in Moraga, California at 2nd-seeded St. Mary's, and defeated the Gaels 71–70.  Kent State next traveled across the country to face 6th-seeded Fairfield, and defeated the Stags in Bridgeport, Connecticut 72–68.  The win advanced Kent State to the NIT quarterfinals for the first time since 2000.  In the quarterfinals, they played top-seeded Colorado, and lost to the Buffaloes 81–74 in Boulder, Colorado to finish the season with an overall record of 25–12.

On March 27, Bradley University announced they had hired Geno Ford to become their next head coach.

Awards 
On March 7, 2011, head coach Geno Ford was named the Coach of the Year in the Mid-American Conference while Junior forward Justin Greene was named the conference Player of the Year.  It was Ford's second consecutive Coach of the Year award and marks the eighth time a KSU coach has won the award (Jim McDonald, 1990; Gary Waters, 1999 and 2000; Stan Heath, 2002; and Jim Christian, 2006 and 2008). Ford also became the fourth coach in MAC history to win back-to-back Coach of the Year awards and won the award by one vote over Miami's Charlie Coles.  Greene was the first KSU player since Al Fisher in 2008 to be named Player of the Year and the third Kent State player overall to win the award, joining DeAndre Haynes in 2006.  Greene won the award by three votes over Julian Muvunga of Miami and D. J. Cooper of Ohio.

On March 8, Kent State players Michael Porrini and Carlton Guyton were honored by the Mid-American Conference as Porrini was named MAC Defensive Player of the Year and Guyton was named MAC Sixth Man of the Year.  Porrini was the fourth Kent State player to earn the award and marked the fifth Defensive Player of the Year award for Kent State (Demertic Shaw; 2001 and 2002; John Edwards, 2004; and Haminn Quaintance, 2008).  Guyton was the third KSU player to win the Sixth Man award, after Anthony Simpson in 2010 and Kevin Warzynski in 2006.

Notes

Kent State Golden Flashes men's basketball seasons
Kent State Golden Flashes
Kent State
Kent State
Kent State